Sarenput I was an ancient Egyptian official during the reign of pharaoh Senusret I of the 12th Dynasty.

Career
Sarenput held several titles such as nomarch of the 1st nomos of Upper Egypt ("Land of the Bow"), mayor of Elephantine, overseer of the priests of Satet, overseer of the foreign lands and many others. Like his distant predecessors Harkhuf and Heqaib, he also was the king's personal trading agent for the goods from Nubia and had a role in one of Senusret I's military campaign in this country, when the king rewarded Sarenput as reported in the latter's autobiography from his tomb. The same king appointed Sarenput as nomarch, probably the first one for this nomos.
Many of Sarenput's attestations came from the sanctuary of Heqaib at Elephantine, where he ordered a shrine for the deified Heqaib and also one for himself, provided by many stelae and a statue depicting him.

Tomb

Sarenput I was buried in a large rock-cut tomb at Qubbet el-Hawa (No. 36), which was decorated in sunk reliefs at the outside, and lively painted in the interior. The tomb is composed of three rooms connected by hallways; the first two chambers are provided with colonnades while the innermost has a niche that once housed a statue of the owner. Unfortunately, the whole tomb suffered significant damage over time.
The outer reliefs often depicts Sarenput with some of his relatives and his dogs, while among the survived inner paintings there is a scene of the owner with the god Khnum, which is significant because in this period, a similar scene in a private tomb was still rare. The aforementioned autobiography is written in two copies, one outside and one inside the tomb. There is a significant artistic contrast between the reliefs carved on the outer doorjambs (see picture in the infobox) and the ones on the façade of the tomb, the former being far finer and possibly made by some royal sculptor, while the latter being more crude and likely a local product.

See also
Sarenput II – His nephew, also a nomarch of the same nomos

References

Further reading

 Labib Habachi, The Sanctuary of Heqaib (= Elephantine 4 = Archäologische Veröffentlichungen. (AV). Bd. 33). 2 voll, von Zabern, Mainz 1985, .

Officials of the Twelfth Dynasty of Egypt
Nomarchs
Ancient Egyptian overseers of foreign lands
Overseers of the priests of Satet